Radek Mynář (born 22 November 1974) is a Czech former footballer (defender). After playing in the Czech First League for Marila Příbram and Sparta Prague, he moved to Poland where he played for Dyskobolia Grodzisk and then Polonia Warsaw.

References
 
 

1974 births
Living people
Czech footballers
Czech expatriate footballers
1. FK Příbram players
AC Sparta Prague players
Dyskobolia Grodzisk Wielkopolski players
Polonia Warsaw players
Czech First League players
Ekstraklasa players
Association football defenders
People from Česká Lípa
Expatriate footballers in Poland
Czech expatriate sportspeople in Poland
Sportspeople from the Liberec Region